is a Japanese baseball player. He won a bronze medal at the 1992 Summer Olympics.

References 
 

Baseball players at the 1992 Summer Olympics
Olympic baseball players of Japan
1965 births
People from Miyazaki Prefecture
Living people
Olympic medalists in baseball

Medalists at the 1992 Summer Olympics
Olympic bronze medalists for Japan